Altrincham was a semi-professional rugby league club based in Altrincham, Cheshire, England.

They joined the Northern Union in 1901–02 and played for the single season in the Lancashire Senior Competition, which was effectively Division 2 (West). Although they were from Cheshire, they, like several other Cheshire clubs and some Cumberland clubs, participated in the Lancashire Competitions.

History 

They joined the ranks of the semi-professionals when they became members of the Northern Union for the 1901–02 season finishing in 12th position out of 13 clubs (with an unenviable record of only one win and one draw).

At the end of the 1901–02 season, the County Leagues elected 18 teams to join the new Division 2 (7 from Lancashire and 10 from Yorkshire and new member South Shields) with the existing second competition scrapped.

Altrincham were one of the 4 Yorkshire (Goole, Heckmondwike, Liversedge and Sowerby Bridge) and 2 Lancashire clubs (the other being Radcliffe) not elected to the new Division 2, but it is unknown as to which route the club followed.

Club League Record 
In the single season in which Altrincham played semi-professional rugby league, 1901–02, there are few records readily available. 

Some of the achievements are as follows:-

Heading Abbreviations
RL = Single division; Pl = Games played; W = Win; D = Draw; L = Lose; PF = Points for; PA = Points against; Diff = Points difference (+ or -); Pts = League points
% Pts = A percentage system was used to determine league positions due to clubs playing varying number of fixtures and against different opponents 
League points: for win = 2; for draw = 1; for loss = 0.

Several fixtures & results 
The following are just a few of Altrincham's fixtures during the sole season in which they played semi-professional rugby league 

-

Notes and Comments 
1 - Folly Fields is the stadium used by Wigan at the time until 1901. They then became sub-tenants of Springfield Park See below - Note 2. 

2 - Wigan became sub-tenants of Springfield Park, which they shared with Wigan United AFC, playing their first game there on 14 September 1901 at which a crowd of 4,000 saw them beat Morecambe 12–0, and the last game on 28 April 1902 when Wigan beat the Rest of Lancashire Senior Competition. A temporary ground was necessary to span the period between moving from Folly Fields and the new ground at Central Park being constructed.
3 - Lowerhouse Lane is the original site of the current ground used by Widnes. It was renamed Naughton Park in 1932 in honour of club secretary, Tom Naughton - and later renamed Halton Stadium after being completely rebuilt in 1997.

See also 
List of defunct rugby league clubs

References 

Defunct rugby league teams in England
Sport in Trafford
Rugby clubs established in 1901
Altrincham
Rugby league teams in Greater Manchester
English rugby league teams